Giovanni Valentina (born 30 June 1975) is a Brazilian rower. He competed in the men's quadruple sculls event at the 1996 Summer Olympics.

References

1975 births
Living people
Brazilian male rowers
Olympic rowers of Brazil
Rowers at the 1996 Summer Olympics
Sportspeople from Porto Alegre